Antoinette Lombard is the Head of the Department of Social Work and Criminology  and a Professor in Social Work at the University of Pretoria. She is a member of the Academy of Science of South Africa. She was awarded the James Billups International Consortium for Social Development Leadership Award in Social Development prize in 2013. She is the Programme Director of the Fordham University’s Ubuntu Exchange Programme with the University of Pretoria. She is the Chairperson of Global Agenda Committee in International Association of Schools of Social Work.

References

External links
 Antoinette Lombard on ResearchGate

South African women scientists
21st-century women scientists
Academic staff of the University of Pretoria
Living people
Year of birth missing (living people)